Enterostatin is a pentapeptide derived from a proenzyme in the gastrointestinal tract called procolipase. It reduces food intake, in particular fat intake, when given peripherally or into the brain.

Function
Enterostatin is created in the intestine by pancreatic procolipase, the other colipase serving as an obligatory cofactor for pancreatic lipase during fat digestion. Enterostatin can be created in the gastric mucosa and the mucosal epithelia in the small intestine. An increased high fat diets will cause the procolipase gene transcription and enterostatin to release into the gastrointestinal lumen. Enterostatin appears in the lymph and circulation after a meal. Enterostatin has been shown to selectively reduce fat intake during a normal meal. The testing has been successful with different species.

Signaling pathway
The signaling pathway of the peripheral mechanism uses afferent vagal to hypothalamic centers. The central responses are mediated through a pathway including serotonergic and opioidergic components. Inveterately, enterostatin cuts fat intake, bodyweight, and body fat. This reaction may involve multiple metabolic effects of enterostatin, which include a decrease of insulin secretion, a growth in sympathetic drive to brown adipose tissue, and the stimulation of adrenal corticosteroid secretion.  A possible pathophysiological role is indicated by studies that have associated low enterostatin output and/or responsiveness to breeds of rat that become obese and prefer dietary fat. Humans with obesity also exhibit a lower secretion from pancreatic procolipase after a test meal, compared with persons of normal weight.

Effects
Its effects include a reduction of insulin secretion, an increase in sympathetic drive to brown adipose tissue, and the stimulation of adrenal corticosteroid secretion. At the end level, it initiates a sensation of fullness of stomach which could be the reason for its role in regulation of fat intake and reduction of body weight. For enterostatin to be utilized it needs the presence of CCK A receptors. Studies based on rats who lack these receptors have found them to be un-responsive to enterostatin.

When rats have been injected with high doses of enterostatin into the brain the rats ate progressively less food as the dose was increased.
In rats, examination of experiments involving the effects of peripheral or intracerebroventricular administration of enterostatin show this selectively slows down fat consumption.

Medical trials
Although enterostatin-like immunoreactivities exist in blood, brain, and gut, and exogenous enterostatins decrease fat appetite and insulin secretion in rats, the roles of these peptides in human obesity remain to be examined.,

References

Digestive system
Pentapeptides